Shubhankar Sharma (born 21 July 1996) is a professional golfer from India. In December 2017, he recorded his first tour win in the Joburg Open and followed this with a second win at the Maybank Championship in February 2018. He studied at Bal Bhawan School, Bhopal.

Professional career
Turning professional in 2013, Sharma played on the Asian Development Tour in 2014. He also finished fourth in the Panasonic Open India, a 2014 Asian Tour event.

From 2015 to 2017, Sharma played primarily on the Asian Tour. He played in the TAKE Solutions India Masters on the 2015 Asian Development Tour, losing in a playoff to S. Chikkarangappa. The following week he was fourth in the Panasonic Open India on the Asian Tour. In 2016, Sharma finished third in the Bashundhara Bangladesh Open and tied for fourth in the Resorts World Manila Masters and finished 51st in the Order of Merit.

Sharma started 2017 finishing fourth in the Bashundhara Bangladesh Open and in the top-10 in the Maybank Championship, an event co-sanctioned with the European Tour.
After these two events in February it was not until November that he showed a return to form with a top-10 finish in the UBS Hong Kong Open, another event co-sanctioned with the European Tour.

Two weeks later he came to more notice in the Joburg Open where a second round of 61, followed by a 65, gave him a five-stroke lead at the start of the last round. The final round was delayed by bad weather but Sharma finished with a 69 for a three-stroke win over Erik van Rooyen. The event was part of the Open Qualifying Series and the win gave him an entry to the 2018 Open Championship.  The win also earned him full membership of the European Tour.

Sharma had a final round 62 to win the Maybank Championship in February 2018, an event co-sanctioned by the Asian Tour and the European Tour, two ahead of Jorge Campillo. The win lifted him into the world top-100 for the first time. He also took an early lead in the European Tour's Race to Dubai, earning a place in the 2018 WGC-Mexico Championship in March. At the WGC-Mexico Championship Sharma held the lead after the second and third rounds. However, he faltered with a final-round 74 and finished the tournament in a tie for ninth place. It was his first start in a PGA Tour event. Two days after the tournament he received an invitation to play in the Masters Tournament, his first major championship appearance and the fourth Indian to play in the Masters, Jeev Milkha Singh, Arjun Atwal and Anirban Lahiri were the previous three to play.

Personal life
Sharma is a strict vegetarian for ethical and religious reasons, who has stated that he has never consumed meat in his life. He's also allergic to gluten.

Professional wins (8)

European Tour wins (2)

1Co-sanctioned by the Sunshine Tour
2Co-sanctioned by the Asian Tour

Asian Tour wins (2)

1Co-sanctioned by the Sunshine Tour
2Co-sanctioned by the European Tour

Professional Golf Tour of India wins (6)

Results in major championships
Results not in chronological order before 2019.

CUT = missed the half-way cut
"T" = tied

Results in World Golf Championships

QF, R16, R32, R64 = Round in which player lost in match play
"T" = Tied

References

External links

Profile on PGTI's official site

Asian Tour golfers
Indian male golfers
Recipients of the Arjuna Award
People from Jhansi
1996 births
Living people